Abia de la Obispalía is a municipality in Cuenca, Castile-La Mancha, Spain. It has a population of 61 as of 2020.

A prestigious late Bronze Age hoard of gold jewellery was found in a cave near the village in the early twentieth century. Known as the Abia de la Obispalia Hoard, it is now in the British Museum's collection.

Tourism

Abia de la Obispalía Castle, of Roman origin

References

Municipalities in the Province of Cuenca